UAA may refer to:

Education 
 Universidad Adventista de las Antillas, a private university in Mayaguez, Puerto Rico, part of the Seventh-day Adventist education system
 Universidad Autónoma de Aguascalientes, a public university in Aguascalientes, Mexico
 University of Alaska Anchorage, a public university in Anchorage, Alaska, USA, part of the University of Alaska system
 University of Alberta Augustana Faculty, a faculty of the University of Alberta located in Camrose, Alberta, Canada
 University Athletic Association, an athletic conference of US private university sports teams
 Üsküdar American Academy, a private coeducational high school in Istanbul, Turkey

Science 
 UAA ("ochre"), a genetic stop codon

Technology 
 Universal Audio Architecture, an initiative to standardize audio devices in Microsoft Windows
 Universally Administered Address, a type of MAC address

Arts 
 United Arts Agency, an arts collective located in California, USA
 Universal Academy of the Arts - Dance and Musical Theatre School, UK

Other uses 
 Under Armour (NYSE Class A ticker UAA)
 Uniform Adoption Act, a proposed model law in USA
 United Artists Associated, a former distributor of theatrical feature films and short subjects for television
 University Air Squadron, RAF training unit
 United Assassins Association, fictional organization from the video game series No More Heroes (series)